"Gone" is a song by American indie pop band JR JR from their self-titled third album, JR JR in 2015. The song was written by the duo, along with Dan Nigro. The music video for the song was released on August 19, 2015.

Music video
The music video begins with short clips of people who seem to be bothered, when their lower halves detach from their upper halves and run around, before they are seen dancing, walking, and enjoying themselves around a city. It also features a quick cameo of the band on a newspaper under a headline. The song ends with the duo on a television in an 8-bit animation style and some legs running towards the camera.

Use in media
The song was featured in the trailer and soundtrack of the movie Sausage Party, as well as in the 2016 hit movie Bad Moms.

The song was also used in a 2020 Chase Bank TV advertisement, and also appeared in a Kinder Joy TV commercial the same year.

Charts

Weekly charts

Year-end charts

References

External links
 .

2015 singles
2015 songs
Warner Records singles
Songs written by Dan Nigro